A spill of the leadership of the Liberal Party of Australia took place on March 23, 1993, following the 1993 federal election. The spill was won by incumbent leader John Hewson over former leader John Howard by 47 votes to 30 while backbencher Bruce Reid attracted only one sole vote, presumably his own. For the Deputy leadership Michael Wooldridge won against Peter Costello

Background
After John Hewson was blamed for losing the 1993 "unloseable election" because of his staunch promotion of a Goods and Services Tax and an inability to sell his policies to voters, Hewson initially stated he would not recontest but was convinced to do so to block John Howard from winning.

Candidates
 John Hewson, incumbent Leader, Member for Wentworth
 John Howard, Shadow Minister for Industrial Relations, Employment and Training, Member for Bennelong
 Bruce Reid, Member for Bendigo

Results

The following tables gives the ballot results:

Leadership ballot

Deputy leadership ballot

Other candidates in order of elimination:

 Ken Aldred, David Connolly and Alexander Downer
 Wilson Tuckey
 Peter Reith
 David Jull

Aftermath
Over the following year Hewson's leadership was undermined by the likes of Peter Costello and Bronwyn Bishop. This led to his defeat in May 1994 by Alexander Downer.

References

Liberal Party of Australia leadership spills
Liberal Party of Australia leadership spill